Linum (flax) is a genus of approximately 200 species in the flowering plant family Linaceae. They are native to temperate and subtropical regions of the world. The genus includes the common flax (L. usitatissimum), the bast fibre of which is used to produce linen and the seeds to produce linseed oil.

The flowers of most species are blue or yellow, rarely red, white, or pink, and some are heterostylous. There is an average of 6 to 10 seeds per boll.

Linum species are used as food plants by the larvae of some Lepidoptera species including the cabbage moth, the nutmeg, the setaceous Hebrew character and Coleophora striolatella, which feeds exclusively on Linum narbonense.

Cultivation 
Several flaxes are cultivated as garden ornamentals, including the blue-flowered species blue flax (L. narbonense), Lewis' blue flax (L. lewisii), and perennial blue flax (L. perenne), the red-flowered scarlet flax (L. grandiflorum), and the yellow-flowered golden flax (L. flavum). In Eurasia, since Roman times, the genus Linum has been cultivated not only for its plant fiber, but also its seeds and tender leaves for culinary usage.

Selected species 

Linum africanum
Linum alatum – winged flax
Linum album
Linum alpinum
Linum arboreum – tree flax
Linum arenicola – sand flax
Linum aristatum – bristle flax
Linum australe – southern flax
Linum austriacum – Asian flax
Linum berlandieri – Berlandier's yellow flax
Linum bienne (syn. L. angustifolium) – pale flax
Linum campanulatum
Linum cariense
Linum carteri – Carter's flax
Linum catharticum – fairy flax
Linum compactum – Wyoming flax
Linum cratericola – Galápagos Islands flax
Linum dolomiticum
Linum elongatum – Laredo flax
Linum flavum – golden flax
Linum floridanum – Florida yellow flax
Linum grandiflorum – scarlet flax, flowering flax
Linum hirsutum – downy flax
Linum hudsonioides – Texas flax
Linum imbricatum – tufted flax
Linum intercursum – sandplain flax
Linum kingii – King's flax
Linum leoni
Linum lewisii – Lewis' blue flax, Lewis flax
Linum lundellii – Sullivan City flax
Linum macrocarpum – Spring Hill flax
Linum marginale – Australian native flax
Linum medium – stiff yellow flax
Linum monogynum – New Zealand linen flax
Linum narbonense – blue flax
Linum neomexicanum – New Mexico yellow flax
Linum perenne – perennial blue flax
Linum pratense – meadow flax
Linum puberulum – plains flax
Linum pubescens
Linum rigidum -– stiffstem flax
Linum rupestre – rock flax
Linum schiedeanum – Schiede's flax
Linum strictum – ridged yellow flax
Linum subteres – Sprucemont flax, slenderfoot flax
Linum suffruticosum
Linum sulcatum – grooved flax
Linum tenuifolium
Linum trigynum – French flax
Linum ucranicum
Linum usitatissimum – common cultivated flax
Linum vernal – Chihuahuan flax
Linum virginianum – woodland flax
Linum westii – West's flax

References

External links

IPNI Query
Linum lepagei type sheet from Louis-Marie Herbarium (Laval University).
The Flax Council of Canada

 
Malpighiales genera